Pistols 'n' Petticoats is an American Western sitcom starring Ann Sheridan that ran on CBS during the 1966-1967 television season. It was produced by Kayro/Universal Television for CBS Productions and ran from September 17, 1966 to March 11, 1967. The series was created by George Tibbles, who wrote the show's theme song. This was one of two sitcoms that ran on CBS with the "Petticoat" name in its title at the time, the other being Petticoat Junction, which was produced by Filmways and has no connection to this program.

Premise
Pistols 'n' Petticoats chronicled the lives of the gunslinging Hanks family, which consisted of Grandpa (Andrew), his wife Grandma (Effie), widowed daughter Henrietta, granddaughter (and Henrietta's daughter) Lucy, and their pet wolf Bowser. The "Petticoats" referred to the Hanks ladies, even though Lucy (who was raised in the city) would spend more time being at odds with the rest of the clan rather than helping protect their land.

The Hanks lived in the fictional town of Wretched, Colorado, in the year 1870, where at that time, the sprawling Old West was being occupied by outlaws. It was up to the Hanks to clean up the town, which made them more popular with the citizens than with the town sheriff, Harold Sikes, who did not like having the spotlight shine on the Hanks. The Hanks also had adversaries with rival Buss Courtney and members of a nearby Indian tribe, led by Chief Eagle Shadow, and his assistants, Grey Hawk and Little Bear.

Cast
Ann Sheridan as Henrietta Hanks
Ruth McDevitt as Grandma Effie Hanks
Carole Wells as Lucy Hanks
Douglas Fowley as Grandpa Andrew Hanks
Gary Vinson as Sheriff Harold Sikes
Robert Lowery as Buss Courtney
Lon Chaney, Jr. as Chief Eagle Shadow
Marc Cavell as Grey Hawk
Alex Henteloff as Little Bear
Jay Silverheels as Great Bear
Eleanor Audley as Mrs. Teaseley

Guest stars
  
Read Morgan as Moose Dreyfus in "The Triangle"
Lurene Tuttle as Adelaide Coulter in "Grandma's Date"
Judy Canova as Sadie in "The Golden Fleece" and Daisy Frogg in "Faint Heart Never Won Grandpa"
Fred Willard as Ben in "Quit Shootin' Folks, It's Grandma"
Simon Scott as Sloan in 1x09 "Cards Anyone"

Production notes

The series would be Ann Sheridan's last role, as she died of cancer on January 21, 1967, nearly two months before CBS cancelled the series. Of the 26 shows that were produced, Sheridan only appeared in 21 episodes. Universal Pictures used several episodes as "archive footage" for the 1967 feature film The Far Out West.

In the pilot episode Chris Noel was cast as Sheridan's daughter, but test audiences found her portrayal unsympathetic; she was replaced by Carole Wells.

Currently, both Universal Home Video and Echo Bridge Home Video hold the DVD rights to the series.

Pistols 'n' Petticoats was filmed in color, which, by the fall of 1966, became the standard in all prime-time network programming.

Episodes

References

External links

Pistols 'n' Petticoats at TV Shows on DVD
Pistols 'n' Petticoats at TV Party

1966 American television series debuts
1967 American television series endings
1960s American sitcoms
CBS original programming
1960s Western (genre) television series
Fiction set in 1870
Television series set in the 1870s
Television shows set in Colorado
Television series by Universal Television
Black-and-white American television shows
English-language television shows